The 1936–37 Toronto Maple Leafs season was the 20th season of play for the Toronto NHL franchise, tenth as the Maple Leafs.

Offseason

Regular season

Final standings

Record vs. opponents

Schedule and results

Playoffs
The Maple Leafs played the New York Rangers in the first round in a best of three series and got swept in 2 games.

Player statistics

Regular season
Scoring

Goaltending

Playoffs
Scoring

Goaltending

Awards and records

Transactions
May 6, 1936: Acquired Turk Broda from the Detroit Red Wings for $8,000
May 7, 1936: Traded Andy Blair to the Chicago Black Hawks for cash
May 7, 1936: Claimed Murray Armstrong from the New York Rangers in Inter-league Draft
November 24, 1936: King Clancy retires
December 29, 1936: Acquired loan of Bill Kendall from the Chicago Black Hawks for loan of Pep Kelly for remainder of the 1936–37 season

See also
1936–37 NHL season

References

External links
 

Toronto Maple Leafs seasons
Toronto
Toronto